Phu Miang—Phu Thong Wildlife Sanctuary is a wildlife sanctuary in Chat Trakan District of Phitsanulok Province and Nam Pat District of Uttaradit Province of Thailand.

Geography

Topography
Landscape is mostly covered by forested mountains, such as Khao Khwam Ruea , Khao Laem Ngam Laem Thon , Khao Lak Kachan , Khao Lon , Khao Thong  and Phu Miang is with  the highest. Most of the sanctuary has a slope between 16% and 35%.
The total forested area is 95%, divided into 35% high slope mountain area (upper-slopes, shallow valleys, mountain tops and deeply incised streams) and 60% hill slope area (open slopes, u-shaped valleys and midslope ridges).

History
Phu Miang—Phu Thong forest in the area of Chat Trakan District, Phitsanulok Province and Nam Pat District, Uttaradit Province was declared a wildlife sanctuary, which was publized in the Government Gazette, volume 94, issue 137, dated December 31, 1977. Royal Forest Department extended the wildlife sanctuary with Bo Thong Subdistrict, Thong Saen Khan Minordistrict, Uttaradit Province, proclaimed in the Government Gazette, volume 106, issue 157, dated September 20, 1989. In 1992 the wildlife sanctuary was extended again, this time with Pa Daeng Subdistrict, Chat Trakan District, Phitsanulok Province, which was announced in the Government Gazette, volume 109, issue 42, dated April 8, 1992. Since 2002 this wildlife sanctuary has been managed by Protected Areas Regional Office 11 (Phitsanulok).

Flora
The sanctuary features mixed deciduous forest (65%), hill evergreen forest (26%), agricultural area (4%), degraded forest (3%), dry evergreen forest and bamboo forest, each at less than 1%.

Fauna
Mammals in the sanctuary are:

Birds, of which species:

Location

See also
 List of protected areas of Thailand
 List of Protected Areas Regional Offices of Thailand

References

Wildlife sanctuaries of Thailand
Geography of Phitsanulok province
Tourist attractions in Phitsanulok province
1977 establishments in Thailand
Protected areas established in 1977